The Dunhuang Manichaean texts refers to three Manichaean manuscripts of the Tang Dynasty found in the Buddhist scripture cave of Mogao Grottoes in Dunhuang.

 Chinese Manichaean hymn scroll
 Incomplete scripture of Manichaeism
 Manichaean Compendium

References 

Manichaean texts